Kristiine Lill (born February 1, 1971) is an Estonian curler and curling coach.

At the national level, she is an eight-time Estonian women's champion curler (2007, 2009, 2011, 2012, 2013, 2014, 2015, 2016), a three-time Estonian mixed champion curler (2005, 2007, 2016) and a four-time Estonian mixed doubles champion curler (2008, 2009, 2011, 2012).

Teams

Women's

Mixed

Mixed doubles

Record as a coach of national teams

References

External links

Living people
1971 births
Sportspeople from Tallinn
Estonian female curlers
Estonian curling champions
Estonian curling coaches